The King's England is a topographical and historical book series written and edited by Arthur Mee in 43 volumes. The first, introductory, volume was published in 1936; in 1989, The King's England Press was established to reprint the series.

It was said that the series was a modern Domesday Book and that the compilers had travelled half-a-million miles in order to complete their task. The vast majority of the content is a description of churches and associated local worthies.

Original titles
The first title in the series was the introductory volume, Enchanted Land: Half-a-million miles in the King's England, published by Hodder and Stoughton in 1936.

Revised titles
In 1970, the London volume was split into three. Bomb damage during the Second World War, the subsequent post-war reconstruction and alterations to local government boundaries in 1965 all made it difficult to treat London properly in one volume. The new volumes, which brought the total to 43, were:

 London North of the Thames except the City and Westminster (1972)
 London – The City and Westminster
 London South of the Thames

Reprints
In 1989, The King's England Press was established to reprint the series, "recognising the need for them, both as excellent guidebooks and now with the added dimension as historical documents in their own right."

References

Series of history books
History books about England
Topography
Series of non-fiction books